Nancy Durham is a Canadian journalist.

Career
Durham was born and educated in Canada at the University of Western Ontario and York University. She began her career in journalism at the Canadian Broadcasting Corporation (CBC) in Toronto in the seventies. After emigrating to the UK in 1984 she continued to work as a journalist for the CBC as well as with the British Broadcasting Corporation (BBC). In 1994 she became a video journalist covering the breakup of Yugoslavia from all sides in the conflict. Her television work took her across Europe, the former USSR, Africa, Europe, and Iraq. She is an occasional presenter on Monocle 24 internet radio and a trustee of the Open Society Foundations, London.

Personal life
In 2003 she and her husband, the Oxford philosopher of science William Newton-Smith, planted a field of lavender on their farm in mid Wales, the first to do so in Wales on a field scale. They have since expanded their operations becoming the only distillers of lavender oil in Wales. Their company, Welsh Lavender Ltd, produces face and body creams.

References

External links
 CBC biography of Nancy Durham 
 Welsh Lavender Ltd

Canadian women journalists
Living people
Year of birth missing (living people)
York University alumni
Canadian women non-fiction writers